The Bajram Aliu  is a multi-use stadium in Skenderaj, Kosovo. It is currently used mostly for football matches and is the home ground of Drenica of the Kosovar Superliga. The stadium holds 9,000 people. It was built prior to the Kosovo War.

After a 25-year attempt to join the UEFA (and by extension FIFA), Kosovo was permitted to join in 2016, which opened them up to much-needed financial sponsorship that would be put into renovating and restoring existing football facilities.

Notes and references
Notes:

References:

External links
Stadium information

Skenderaj